The Protestant Christian Church in Mentawai is a Lutheran denomination in Indonesia. It is a member of the Lutheran World Federation, which it joined in 1984.

External links 
Lutheran World Federation listing

Lutheran denominations
Lutheranism in Indonesia
Mentawai Islands Regency
Lutheran World Federation members